The 1995 Irish Masters was the twenty-first edition of the professional invitational snooker tournament, which took place from 21 to 26 March 1995. The tournament was played at Goffs in Kill, County Kildare, and featured twelve professional players.

Peter Ebdon won the title for the first time, beating Stephen Hendry 9–8 in the final.

Main draw

References

Irish Masters
Irish Masters
Irish Masters
Irish Masters